Vanendert is a surname. Notable people with the surname include:

Dennis Vanendert (born 1988), Belgian cyclist
Jelle Vanendert (born 1985), Belgian cyclist

Surnames of Belgian origin